Marial may refer to:

Marial, Oregon, an unincorporated community in Curry County, Oregon, United States
Guor Marial (born 1984), South Sudanese track and field athlete
Juli Marial (died 1971), president and player of FC Barcelona

See also
 Mariel (disambiguation)